Mycena manipularis is a species of agaric fungus in the family Mycenaceae.  Found in Australasia, Malaysia, and the Pacific islands, the mycelium and fruit bodies of the fungus are bioluminescent.

See also 
List of bioluminescent fungi

References

External links 

manipularis
Bioluminescent fungi
Fungi of Oceania
Fungi of Asia
Taxa named by Miles Joseph Berkeley
Fungi described in 1854
Fungi without expected TNC conservation status